Sir Edward Cecil Moore, 1st Baronet (22 November 1851 – 7 December 1923) was Lord Mayor of London from 1922 to 1923.

See also 
Moore baronets

References 
Profile, ukwhoswho.com. Accessed 22 December 2022.

1851 births
1923 deaths
20th-century lord mayors of London
19th-century British politicians
20th-century British politicians